The anthem for Delta Amacuro State, Venezuela, was written by José Joaquín de León; the music for it was written by José Inés Richemón.

Lyrics (in Spanish)

Chorus

Amacuro Girón de la patria
del proceso estandarte y blasón, 
en tu delta germina la fibra
que dará mas firmeza y unión.

I 
Tus compañías y ríos hermosos
del progreso general la acción, 
es inmenso y es fértil tu suelo
que estremece de grande emoción.

II 
En tu suelo fulgura la estrella 
de la noble y heroica deidad; 
sitio honroso y trabajo fecundo
tendrás siempre con gran libertad.

III  
Tu pujanza y denuedo es lección 
que se vierte grandiosa en historia,
y que aumente los patrios anales
con el bello fulgor de la gloria.

See also
 List of anthems of Venezuela

Venezuelan songs
Anthems of Venezuela
Spanish-language songs